Waltham is a city in Waltham Township, Mower County, Minnesota, United States.  The population was 151 at the 2010 census.

History
Waltham was platted in 1885, and named after Waltham, Massachusetts.

Geography

Demographics

2010 census
As of the census of 2010, there were 151 people, 67 households, and 40 families living in the city. The racial makeup of the city was 97.4% White, 0.7% Asian, and 2.0% from two or more races. Hispanic or Latino of any race were 2.0% of the population.

There were 67 households, of which 23.9% had children under the age of 18 living with them, 49.3% were married couples living together, 4.5% had a female householder with no husband present, 6.0% had a male householder with no wife present, and 40.3% were non-families. 31.3% of all households were made up of individuals, and 6% had someone living alone who was 65 years of age or older. The average household size was 2.25 and the average family size was 2.90.

The median age in the city was 41.2 years. 19.9% of residents were under the age of 18; 7.1% were between the ages of 18 and 24; 28.5% were from 25 to 44; 33.1% were from 45 to 64; and 11.3% were 65 years of age or older. The gender makeup of the city was 54.3% male and 45.7% female.

2000 census
As of the census of 2000, there were 196 people, 68 households, and 52 families living in the city. The racial makeup of the city was 96.43% White, 3.57% from other races. Hispanic or Latino of any race were 6.63% of the population.

There were 68 households, out of which 39.7% had children under the age of 18 living with them, 61.8% were married couples living together, 8.8% had a female householder with no husband present, and 23.5% were non-families. 20.6% of all households were made up of individuals, and 8.8% had someone living alone who was 65 years of age or older.  The average household size was 2.88 and the average family size was 3.31.

In the city, the population was spread out, with 32.1% under the age of 18, 9.7% from 18 to 24, 27.6% from 25 to 44, 16.3% from 45 to 64, and 14.3% who were 65 years of age or older.  The median age was 35 years. For every 100 females, there were 98.0 males.  For every 100 females age 18 and over, there were 98.5 males.

The median income for a household in the city was $35,000, and the median income for a family was $35,625. Males had a median income of $27,500 versus $21,042 for females. The per capita income for the city was $26,047.  About 4.1% of families and 5.2% of the population were below the poverty line, including 8.3% of those under the age of eighteen and none of those 65 or over.

References

Further reading

Cities in Mower County, Minnesota
Cities in Minnesota